The Partition of Triparadisus was a power-sharing agreement passed at Triparadisus in 321 BC between the generals (Diadochi) of Alexander the Great, in which they named a new regent and arranged the repartition of the satrapies of Alexander's empire among themselves. It followed and modified the Partition of Babylon made in 323 BC upon Alexander's death.

Following the death of Alexander, the rule of his empire was given to his half-brother Philip Arrhidaeus and Alexander's son Alexander IV. However, since Philip was mentally ill and Alexander IV born only after the death of his father, a regent was named in Perdiccas; in the meantime, the former generals of Alexander were named satraps of the various regions of his empire.

Several satraps were eager to gain more power, and when Ptolemy I Soter, satrap of Egypt, rebelled with other generals, Perdiccas moved against the former but was killed by a mutiny in his camp. Ptolemy declined the regency and instead brought to the office Peithon and Arrhidaeus. This designation met the strong opposition of Eurydice, wife of Philip III, leading, in the meeting called in 321 BC at Triparadisus of all the generals, to their replacement with Antipater. The meeting also proceeded to divide again the satrapies between the various generals.

The treaty
Arrian described the result of the meeting in Events after Alexander, which were transmitted to us by the patriarch Photius (820–897):

"Then and there Antipater made a new division of Asia, wherein he partly confirmed the former and partly annulled it, according as the exigency of affairs required. For, in the first place, Egypt with Libya, and all the vast waste beyond it, and whatever else had been acquired to the westward, he assigned to Ptolemy;
 Syria to Laomedon of Mytilene;
 Cilicia to Philoxenus, for he held it before.
 Among the higher provinces, Mesopotamia and Arbelitis were bestowed on Amphimachus, the king's brother;
 Babylonia, on Seleucus;
 the prefecture of all the province of Susa, on Antigenes, who was captain of the Macedonian Argyraspides, and had first opposed Perdiccas.
Peucestas was confirmed in his government of Persis.
Tlepolemus in Carmania,
and Peithon in that of Media, as far as the Caspian Gates.
Philip in Parthia.
Stasander in Aria and Drangiana.
Stasanor the Solian, over Bactria and Sogdiana;
and Sibyrtius over Arachosia.
The country of the Parapamisians was bestowed upon Oxyartes, the father of Roxana;
and the skirts of India adjacent to Mount Parapamisus, on Peithon the son of Agenor.
As to the countries beyond that, those on the river Indus, with the city Patala (the capital of that part of India) were assigned to Porus.
Those upon the Hydaspes, to Taxiles the Indian;
for it was deemed no easy matter to dispossess those who had been confirmed in their territories by Alexander himself, their power was grown so strong.
Of the countries to the northward of Mount Taurus, Cappadocia was assigned to Nicanor;
Phrygia, Lycaonia, Pamphylia, and Lycia, as before, to Antigonus.
Caria to Asander;
Lydia to Cleitus;
and Hellespontine Phrygia to Arrhidaeus.

Antigenes was deputed collector of the tribute in the province of Susa, and three thousand of those Macedonians who were the most ready to mutiny, appointed to attend him.

Moreover, he appointed Autolychus the son of Agathocles, Amyntas the son of Alexander and brother of Peucestas, Ptolemy the son of Ptolemy, and Alexander the son of Polyperchon, as guards to surround the king's person.

To his son Cassander he gave the command of the horse; and to Antigonus, the troops that had before been assigned to Perdiccas, and the care and custody of the king's person, with order to prosecute the war against Eumenes.
Which done, Antipater himself departed home, much applauded by all, for his wise and prudent management" (Translation John Rooke)

References

Bibliography

 
Partition (politics)
Triparadisus
4th-century BC treaties
321 BC